RC Olomouc is a Czech rugby club based in Olomouc. They currently play in the KB První Liga.

History
The club was founded in 1953. It started when Miloš Dobrý, a former Czechoslovak international and the last president of the Czechoslovak union, moved to Olomouc from Prague in 1951. Initially the club consisted of the Dukla Zenit Olomouc army team and a civilian team. 

One of the club's biggest problems in the early years was securing a home ground. They played at a number of grounds, in the Černovír and Holice areas of the city, the village of Bohuňovice, the race track in Lazce and an open field next to Andrův Stadium. 

In 2003 the club celebrated its 50th anniversary.

Historical names
 1953 - 1960 Dukla Zenit Olomouc
 1956 - 1958 TJ Spartak ŽPB Olomouc
 1958–present RC Lokomotiva Olomouc

External links
RC Olomouc
Rugby Club Olomouc - official sites

Czech rugby union teams
Sport in Olomouc
Rugby clubs established in 1953